"Rocking Music" is a song written, produced, and performed by French DJ and record producer Martin Solveig. The song was released on 16 February 2004 and was the second single from Solveig's debut studio album, Sur la terre (2002). "Rocking Music" peaked at number 47 on the French Singles Chart and number 35 on the UK Singles Chart.

Music video
The music video is about a girl with black ink. The girl has black ink for almost 2 minutes, at which point rain starts to fall, and the ink on her dissolves into a lighter skin. At the end, the lady's lips turn black.

Track listing

Charts

Weekly charts

Year-end charts

Release history

References

2004 singles
2004 songs
Martin Solveig songs
Songs written by Martin Solveig